After Yang is a 2021 American science fiction drama film adaptation written, directed, and edited by Kogonada. It stars Colin Farrell, Jodie Turner-Smith, Justin H. Min, Malea Emma Tjandrawidjaja, and Haley Lu Richardson. The plot follows a family's attempts to repair their unresponsive robotic child. The film had its world premiere at the Cannes Film Festival on July 8, 2021, and was released on March 4, 2022, by A24 and Showtime. It received generally positive reviews from critics.

Plot
Jake and Kyra live with their adoptive daughter Mika and Yang, a previously owned robotic child they purchased from certified reseller Second Siblings, rather than from his original maker, Brothers & Sisters Incorporated. When Yang becomes unresponsive, Jake goes on a mission to repair him. Brothers & Sisters recommend replacing Yang, which means his body will decompose. Not wanting to upset Mika, Jake becomes determined to save his robotic child. In a flashback, Yang reassures a curious Mika that she is still part of the family despite being adopted.

Jake takes Yang to a cheap repairman named Russ, who discovers what he claims is a hidden camera inside of Yang. Jake takes the "camera" to a museum specialist named Cleo, who tells him that it is, in fact, Yang's memory bank. Jake goes home and watches Yang's memories. They include short clips from every day of Yang's life, including his time with a woman named Ada. The next day, Jake takes Yang to Cleo. In a flashback, Yang becomes sad about his inability to truly live.

Jake tracks down Ada, who is revealed to be a clone. She confirms Jake's suspicions that Yang had been in a relationship with her. Jake and Kyra decide to move on, letting Yang decompose and donating his memories to the museum. In a flashback, Yang and Kyra discuss the improbability of an afterlife.

Jake talks to Yang's previous owner, Nancy, who mentions that Yang was not a new product. Jake discovers a setting on the memory bank that unlocks more of Yang's memories. They reveal that Yang had lived an entire life before either Jake or Nancy owned him, one in which he developed a relationship with a woman named Ada. The older Ada is revealed to have cared for the aging mother in Yang's first family. Ada later dies in a car accident. The younger Ada tells Jake that the person in Yang's memories was her great-aunt. At night, Mika tells Jake that she does not want to say goodbye to Yang. Jake agrees, and Mika begins to sing a song previously heard in one of Yang's memories.

Cast

Production

In June 2018, it was reported that producer Theresa Park had acquired screen rights to "Saying Goodbye to Yang", a short story written by Alexander Weinstein. The film would be written and directed by Kogonada. In February 2019, it was announced that Colin Farrell would star in After Yang, which would be distributed by A24. In April 2019, Golshifteh Farahani, Justin H. Min, Sarita Choudhury, and Haley Lu Richardson joined the cast. In May 2019, Jodie Turner-Smith and Clifton Collins Jr. joined the cast, with Turner-Smith replacing Farahani. Principal photography began on May 1, 2019.

Release
The film had its world premiere at the Cannes Film Festival on July 8, 2021 before having its North American premiere on January 21, 2022 at the Sundance Film Festival, where it won the Alfred P. Sloan Prize. It was released simultaneously in theaters and streaming on Showtime on March 4, 2022.

Reception

Box office
In the United States and Canada, After Yang earned an estimated $46,872 from twenty-four theaters in its opening weekend. Internationally, the film grossed $625,282 for a worldwide total of $672,154, against a production budget of $9–20 million.

Critical response

 

Writing for The New York Times, Brandon Yu described the film as an existential crisis for humanity that asked the viewer to evaluate what it means to be alive. Polygons Leo Kim said the film considers many issues, including "a testament on loss, an examination of our reliance on technology, and a deeply human story about care". Richard Brody of The New Yorker said the characters in the film live in a "soft techno-fascism of petty pleasures and alluring surfaces that Kogonada boldly, slyly renders appealing."  David Sims from The Atlantic said the film asked what it means to be human in a world filled with technology, and that "the result is a pensive drama that plays like a quiet mystery, seeking to understand not just its human protagonist but the deeper underpinnings of all social connections."

References

External links
 
 
 
 "Saying Goodbye to Yang" by Alexander Weinstein

2021 films
American independent films
2021 independent films
American science fiction drama films
American robot films
A24 (company) films
Alfred P. Sloan Prize winners
Android (robot) films
Films about artificial intelligence
Films about families
Films based on science fiction short stories
Films directed by Kogonada
Films set in the future
Metaphysical fiction films
2020s English-language films
2020s American films